Fritz Neugebauer was the Second President of the National Council of Austria from 2008 to 2013.

Career
Neugebauer has been a member of the National Council three times. First, in 1996, second, in 1999, and third, since 2002. In 2008, he became Second President of the National Council. He is also Chairman of the Committee for European Union Affairs in the Parliament of Austria and President of the European Confederation of Independent Trade Unions.

References

Politicians from Vienna
Members of the National Council (Austria)
Austrian People's Party politicians
1944 births
Living people